Mayarí is a municipality and town in the Holguín Province of Cuba.

History
The origins of the city date back to 1757 in Spanish Cuba, when the first farms were established here by immigrant colonists. On 19 January 1879 the city became the seat of Mayarí Municipality.

Geography
The municipality is divided into the barrios and hamlets of Barajagua, Cabonico, Cajimaya, Chavaleta Norte, Chavaleta Sur, Guayabo, Juan Vicente, Mateo Sánchez, Punta de Tabaco, Río Frío, Sae-Tía, San Gregario Norte, San Gregorio Sur and Santa Isabel. Birán, the birthplace of Fidel and Raúl Castro, was part of Mayarí until the 1976 reform, when it became part of the neighboring Cueto municipality.

Among other barrios or neighborhoods in this municipality are: Felton (on Cajimaya Bay, once the seaport for the Bethlehem Cuba Iron Mines Company -Bethlehem Steel-), Guaro, Guatemala (on Nipe Bay, previously named Preston and a central sugar mill operated by the United Fruit Company), Nicaro-Levisa (on Levisa Bay, originally named Lengua de Pajaro which translated into English means bird's tongue -as viewed from an air ride-), El Purio, Santa Rita, La Italiana, Mandinga. The last two being on the road to the open mines named Mina Martí where nickel and cobalt exploitation started in the beginnings of the twentieth century by Bethlehem Cuba Iron Mines Company (Bethlehem Steel) and Nicaro Nickel Company.

Demographics
In 2004, the municipality of Mayarí had a population of 105,505.

Main sights
The Sierra Cristal National Park is partly located in the Mayarí Municipality and partly in neighboring Sagua de Tánamo Municipality. Other attractions include Cayo Saetía, a scenic cay with beaches located within the municipality on the Bay of Nipe, north of the Mayarí city.

Popular culture
The city's name Mayarí is in the 1940s song "Voy para Mayarí" ("I'm going to Mayarí"), by Compay Segundo, and in his song "Chan Chan" on the Buena Vista Social Club album.

It also appears in the song “Las Mujeres de Mayarí” (“The women of Mayarí”) in the same album.

See also
Municipalities of Cuba
List of cities in Cuba

References

External links

 
Cities in Cuba
Populated places in Holguín Province
Populated places established in 1757
1750s establishments in Cuba
1757 establishments in the Spanish West Indies
Fidel Castro